Oscar Camilo (born 30 March 1995) is a Colombian professional footballer who plays as forward for Cortuluá.

External links 
 

1995 births
Living people
Colombian footballers
Cortuluá footballers
Association football forwards